Jeff Allen (born January 8, 1990) is a former American football guard. He played college football for Illinois. Allen was drafted by the Kansas City Chiefs in the second round of the 2012 NFL Draft. He has also played for the Houston Texans.

College career
After graduating from Chicago's King High School, Allen attended the University of Illinois at Urbana–Champaign from 2008 to 2011. He started 47 games at both left and right tackle during his career.

Professional career

2012 NFL Draft
Projected as a second round selection by Sports Illustrated, Allen was ranked as the No. 6 offensive guard available in the 2012 NFL Draft. He was drafted by the Kansas City Chiefs in the second round, 44th overall.

Kansas City Chiefs (first stint)
In his rookie season, Allen appeared in all 16 games, and became a starter at left guard by Week 4 against the San Diego Chargers. For his first two seasons with the Chiefs, he played with Jon Asamoah who was a teammate of Allen's at Illinois.

Houston Texans
On March 9, 2016, Allen signed a four-year contract with the Houston Texans.

On May 11, 2018, Allen was placed on the reserve/physically unable to perform list after dealing with concussions and ankle injuries. On July 13, 2018, Allen was released by the Texans after reaching an injury settlement.

Kansas City Chiefs (second stint)
On October 16, 2018, Allen signed with the Kansas City Chiefs.

Allen was re-signed on August 20, 2019. He was released on October 3, 2019. He announced his retirement after the Chiefs won Super Bowl LIV. Despite not being on the roster when the Chiefs won the Super Bowl, he received a Super Bowl ring from the Chiefs.

Personal life
Allen is married to Marrisa Holden, a former Illinois soccer player. They have one daughter and son together.

In 2018, the couple founded The Cookie Society, a gourmet cookie shop based in Frisco, Texas.

References

External links
Kansas City Chiefs bio
Illinois Fighting Illini bio

1990 births
Living people
Players of American football from Chicago
American football offensive guards
American football offensive tackles
Illinois Fighting Illini football players
Kansas City Chiefs players
Houston Texans players